The following is a list of Intelligent Systems for Molecular Biology (ISMB) keynote speakers.

ISMB is an academic conference on the subjects of bioinformatics and computational biology organised by the International Society for Computational Biology (ISCB). The conference has been held annually since 1993 and keynote talks have been presented since 1994. Keynotes are chosen to reflect outstanding research in bioinformatics. The recipients of the ISCB Overton Prize and ISCB Accomplishment by a Senior Scientist Award are invited to give keynote talks as part of the programme.

Keynote speakers include eight Nobel laureates: Richard J. Roberts (1994, 2006), John Sulston (1995), Manfred Eigen (1999), Gerald Edelman (2000), Sydney Brenner (2003), Kurt Wüthrich (2006), Robert Huber (2006) and Michael Levitt (2015).

List of speakers

References

 
Biology conferences